The Hivites ( Ḥiwwîm) were one group of descendants of Canaan, son of Ham, according to the Table of Nations in  (10:17). A variety of proposals have been made, but beyond the references in the Bible to Hivites in the land of Canaan, no consensus has been reached about their precise historical identity.

Etymology
E. C. Hostetter has proposed that the name comes from "tent-dweller," as a cognate to the Hebrew word hawwah, which means tent-camp, although this proposal is rejected by John Day.

No name resembling Hivite has been found in Egyptian or Mesopotamian inscriptions, though the Hiyawa in a Luvian-Phoenician bilingual has been linked to the Biblical Hiwwi.

Location

The Hivites, according to the Book of Joshua, lived in the hilly region of Lebanon from Lebo Hamath to Mount Hermon. Hivites are also mentioned further south in the Masoretic Text of the Hebrew Bible, which assigns to Hivites the towns of Gibeon, Kephirah, Beeroth, and Kiriath-Jearim. However, the Septuagint reads these four towns as inhabited by Horites, suggesting that the name Hivite may have entered the Masoretic Text via a spelling error.

The Masoretic Text of  described the Hivites as being "under Hermon in the land of Mizpeh." However, the Septuagint reads "Hittites" in place of "Hivites," suggesting that one text or the other has suffered an error. 

Similarly in  according to the Masoretic Text, Hivites are mentioned immediately after "the stronghold of Tyre," where the Septuagint once again reads "Hittites."

Biblical mentions 

Within the Hebrew Bible, Hivites are often listed among the inhabitants of Canaan, promised to the descendants of Abraham. , in the Masoretic Text, mentions that one of Esau's wives was "Oholibamah the daughter of Anah, the daughter of Zibeon the Hivite" who is also described as "of the daughters of Canaan". However, textual evidence from the Septuagint and Genesis 36:20 suggest that Zibeon was originally referred to not as a Hivite, but a Horite.

The Book of Joshua claims that Hivites were one of seven groups living in the land of Canaan when the Israelites under Joshua commenced their conquest of the land. These seven nations were to be exterminated: Hittites, Girgashites, Amorites, Canaanites, Perizzites, Hivites and Jebusites. In , Joshua ordered the Hivites of Gibeon to be wood gatherers and water carriers for the Temple of YHWH (see Nethinim).

The Bible records that David's census included Hivite cities. During the reign of Solomon, they are described as part of the slave labor for his many building projects. It is not clear if, when or how they ceased to be a separate group before the Israelite kingdoms came to an end.

See also 
 Mizpah in Gilead (Joshua), where the Hivites were said to live

References

Further reading

Barker, Burdick, Stek, Wessel, Youngblood (Eds.). (1995). The New International Version Study Bible. (10th Ann ed). Grand Rapids, MI: Zondervan.
Bright, John. (2000). A History of Israel. (4th ed.). Louisville, KY: Westminster John Knox Press.
DeVaux, Roland. (1997). Ancient Israel. (John McHugh, Trans.) Grand Rapids, MI: Eerdmans.
Freedman, David Noel (Ed.).  (2000). Eerdmans Dictionary of the Bible. (pp. 597) Grand Rapids, MI: Eerdmans.
Wood, Millard, Packer, Wiseman, Marshall (Eds.). (1996). New Bible Dictionary (3rd ed.) (pp. 477). Downers Grove, IL: Intervarsity Press.

Hebrew Bible nations
Gibeon (ancient city)
Book of Genesis
Book of Joshua
Book of Judges
Books of Samuel